Cheri Melillo (born February 4, 1949-December 26, 2009) was the founder of CANstruction, a food charity that creates sculptures from cans, and has donated over 72 million pounds of food since its formation in 1992. She was the volunteer President and Executive Director of Canstruction for 17 years. She was made an Honorary Member of the American Institute of Architects in 2000, received an award from “The Odyssey of the Mind” in 2009, and was nominated for the New York Post Liberty Medal in the Lifetime Achievement category. Melillo also created and was the editor of the award-winning news journal, SkyLines.

References 

1949 births
2009 deaths
American activists